

# 

 21 Savage (2)
5 Seconds of Summer (3)
 50 Cent (2)

A 

 Akon (7)

B 

 Beyoncé (6) (5 solo, 1 as part of Destiny's Child)
The Black Eyed Peas (6)
B.o.B (2)
 Chris Brown (7)

C 

 Cardi B (1)
Chance The Rapper (1)
 Childish Gambino (1)
 Cobra Starship (1)

D 

D12 (1)
Craig David (1)
Destiny's Child (1)
Dev (1)
Drake (4)

E 

 Eminem (8)
Eve (1)

F 

 Fall Out Boy (1)
 Flo Rida (3)
Luis Fonsi (1)
fun. (1)
 Nelly Furtado (3)

G 

 Ellie Goulding (1)

H 

 Halsey (2)
Keri Hilson (2)
Hinder (1)

J 

 Jeezy (1)
Carly Rae Jepsen (2)

K 

 Kesha (1)
 Alicia Keys (1)
 Khalid (2)

L 

Mary Lambert (1)
Avril Lavigne (2)
 Lil Dicky (1)
Lil Jon (1)
Lil Pump (1) 
Linkin Park (1)
 Jennifer Lopez (3)
 Lorde (3)

M 

 Macklemore (3) (1 solo, 2 as part of Macklemore & Ryan Lewis)
 The Madden Brothers (1)
 Bruno Mars (4)
Jason Mraz (1)

N 

 Nirvana (1)
*NSYNC (1)

O 

 One Direction (3)
 OneRepublic (1)

P 

 Katy Perry (9)
 Post Malone (3)
 Charlie Puth (2)
 P!nk (5)

Q 

 Quavo (2)

R 

 Rihanna (8)
 Nate Ruess (2) (1 solo, 1 as part of fun.)

S 

 Ed Sheeran (8)
Silverchair (1)
Six60 (2)
Sam Smith (2)
 Britney Spears (5)
Taylor Swift (4)

T 

 Timbaland (5)
 Meghan Trainor (3)
T-Pain (3)

U

V

W 

Kanye West (5)
Gin Wigmore (1)
Hayley Williams (1)
 will.i.am. (9) (3 solo, 6 as part of The Black Eyed Peas)

X

Y

Z 

 Zayn (4) (1 solo, 3 as part of One Direction)

References

Number one artists